Nancy Donahue (born February 16, 1958) is an American fashion model and actress.

Career 
She got her start in 1978 when her then boyfriend, who also was a part time model, suggested Nancy enter a model search contest. She beat out 200 contestants to win a contract with Mademoiselle magazine to do 10 covers.(A cover contract was unique in those days and unheard of now) When legendary photographer Patrick Demarchelier found out that she didn't have an agent, he notified Elite, who sent a representative to the studio and she was quickly signed. Donahue worked alongside some of the top international models of the 1980s, including Kim Alexis, Carol Alt, Gia Carangi, Janice Dickinson and Paulina Porizkova. Donahue's face was on the cover and the inside fashion editorial of countless fashion magazines including American Vogue, French Vogue, Vogue Italia, British Vogue, Italian Bazaar, Mademoiselle, Self, Redbook, Glamour and the New York Times and, more recently, More! magazine. Donahue was the face for Helena Rubenstein's beauty campaign in the UK and Virginia Slims in the USA.

Donahue often did the Paris collections for American Vogue along with Gia Carangi, Joan Severance and Kelly Le Brock. She also did some runway work in her early career for Calvin Klein, Ralph Lauren, Donna Karan and Perry Ellis in New York and Hong Kong. Donahue also did countless catalogs for Lord and Taylor, Neiman Marcus and Bloomingdale's. She has worked with numerous photographers including Richard Avedon, Steven Miesel, Francesco Scavullo, Irving Penn, Steve Landis, Arthur Elgort, Denis Piel and Patrick Demarchelier.

Nancy co-authored ONE on ONE with her former husband, the fashion model, Jeff Aquilon, published by Simon & Schuster, a best-selling book about two people giving to each other physically and emotionally.

Donahue was the Pastry Chef at Bianco's Catering Company in Chelmsford, Massachusetts for the ten years where she won numerous awards for her pastry at different events.

Model mismanagement 

Donahue hit the headlines for all the wrong reasons in 1995 when the head of Elite Model Management, John Casablancas, blamed her for recommending David Weil to her as an experienced money manager. Casablancas claimed that the recommendation from Donahue was so good that he never investigated Weil further, nor did he search into the background of his business partner, Peter Bucchieri. The two operated a firm, Star Capital, within Elite's offices and managed many of the model's financial portfolios. They were subsequently accused of mismanaging the funds. On September 21, 1997, Bucchieri, pleaded guilty to conspiring with Weil to sell fictitious Colorado real estate investments to the models. Bucchieri was sentenced to 33 months in prison.  It was subsequently discovered that they had transferred many of the model's funds to their own bank accounts and used it to pay personal bills and make purchases, including a new Porsche. Donahue accepted no blame for the incident and claims that she also lost a considerable amount of money to Bucchieri and Weil.

Acting 
 Exposed, with Nastassja Kinski, 1983
 Portfolio, with Carol Alt, Kelly Emberg, Julie Wolfe and Paulina Porizkova, 1983
 The Self-Destruction of Gia, with Francesco Scavullo, Diane von Fürstenberg, and Janice Dickinson, 2002

Personal life 

Donahue resides in her hometown of Lowell, Massachusetts, with her third husband, local businessman, Steven Joncas.  She has a son, George Eng, from her second marriage.  He is a graduate of College of Charleston class of 2011. He currently resides in Washington, DC.

Notes

Sources 
 New York magazine, Jul 17, 1995 - v. 28, no. 28
 No Lifeguard on Duty: The Accidental Life of the World’s First Supermodel
 
 New York magazine, July 3, 1989 - v. 22, no. 27
 One on One, by Jeff Aquilon and Nancy Donahue, Simon & Schuster, 1984
 "Model Agent Prides himself on discovering ‘raw talent’", Boca Raton News - July 5, 1983
 "Notes Gathered on the Campaign Trail", Boston Globe, Jan 27, 1980
 "Fashion; Model of success; From magazine spreads in the '80s to dessert spreads in the '90s, Lowell's Nancy Donahue takes the cake", Boston Herald; Oct 20, 1999
 Becoming a Professional Model, by Larry Goldman, Beech Tree Books (New York), 1986
 Vogue USA 1980 Jan: "Nancy Donahue" by John Stember
 "Twenty Years as a Self Girl", Self magazine, May 1999, page 218
 "Modeling mogul: It's big business seeking out the Elite", The Ledger, June 29, 1983
 "The Body Game", People magazine, Jan 11, 1993, v. 39, no. 1
 "Spoiled Supermodels", New York magazine - Mar 16, 1981 - v. 14, no. 11
 "Girl Crazy", New York magazine, Jan 25, 1988 - v. 21, no. 4

External links 
 Nancy Donahue's official website

American female models
American film actresses
Actors from Lowell, Massachusetts
1958 births
Living people
21st-century American women